Xenisthmus eirospilus, the spotted wriggler, is a species of fish in the wriggler family, Xenisthmidae, which is regarded as a synonymous with the Eleotridae,. It is distributed in the western Pacific from  Middleton Reef and Ashmore Reef off Australia, West Papua, Indonesia, to Rotuma and Tonga. Its habitat is sand patches among reefs and rubble, as well as in shallow surge areas.

References

eirospilus
Fauna of Melanesia
Fish described in 2004